Radio BIR is a Bosnian commercial Islamic radio station, broadcasting from Sarajevo. The station focuses on Islamic  religious program (e.g. Reading of the Quran), traditional Bosnian Sevdalinka songs and short national news. The program is also available via the Internet at official website www.bir.ba.

History and programming
Radio BIR started with broadcasting on 11 February 2008. It has been created first and foremost in order to transmit the Islamic Prayer Programme for Bosnian Islamic Community.

Since 2015, the headquarters of Radio and Television of the Islamic Community of Bosnia and Herzegovina - BIR is located in the building of the Gazi Husrev-bey's Library in Sarajevo (Gazi Husrev-begova 56A).

Radio BIR through quality educational and educational, cultural and informative political content strives to be the leading media in the public interest that respects and promotes the values of Islam.

The program is currently broadcast on 21 frequencies: 
 Sarajevo  
 Bužim 
 Bihać 
 Sanski Most 
 Kotor Varoš 
 Tuzla 
 Srebrenik 
 Zenica 
 Zavidovići 
 Doboj 
 Fojnica 
 Travnik 
 Bugojno 
 Foča 
 Konjic 
 Mostar 
 Stolac 
 Bratunac 
 Goražde 
 Višegrad 
 Banja Luka

See also 
List of radio stations in Bosnia and Herzegovina

References

External links

 Communications Regulatory Agency of Bosnia and Herzegovina
 Radio BIR page on Facebook

Sarajevo
Radio stations established in 2008
Mass media in Sarajevo